The 1992 Ball State Cardinals football team was an American football team that represented Ball State University in the Mid-American Conference (MAC) during the 1992 NCAA Division I-A football season. In its eighth season under head coach Paul Schudel, the team compiled a 5–6 record (5–4 against conference opponents) and finished in sixth place out of ten teams in the MAC. The team played its home games at Ball State Stadium in Muncie, Indiana.

The team's statistical leaders included Mike Neu with 1,628 passing yards, Corey Croom with 1,157 rushing yards, Brian Oliver with 423 receiving yards, and Mark Swart with 45 points scored.

Schedule

References

Ball State
Ball State Cardinals football seasons
Ball State Cardinals football